Leo Helgas (18 September 1902 – 13 November 1996) was a Finnish middle-distance runner. He competed in the men's 1500 metres at the 1928 Summer Olympics.

References

1902 births
1996 deaths
Athletes (track and field) at the 1928 Summer Olympics
Finnish male middle-distance runners
Olympic athletes of Finland
Place of birth missing